Cariri Metro (though it is technically not a metro system; also known as ) is a , nine station diesel commuter rail line (sometimes referred to as a light rail (VLT) line) in the Cariri region of southern Ceará state, Brazil. It is operated by Companhia Cearense de Transportes Metropolitanos, which also operates the Fortaleza Metro. It is expected to transport about 5,000 passengers per day. The line went into operation on an experimental basis on 1 December 2009, and went into regular service in 2010.

This rail line connects the cities of Crato and Juazeiro do Norte together, and is operated with diesel light rail vehicles (LRVs). The initially estimated cost for implementation of this project was R$ 13,223,522; the cost that was later revised to R$ 25,190,720.

The commuter rail system was implemented on a  existing railway line, where the rail was adjusted to allow for the acquisition of greater speeds between stations.  Five stations were built in Juazeiro do Norte, and four in Crato.

In the future, it is planned to extend this rail line to the city of Barbalha, south of Juazeiro do Norte.

History 

In late 2006 Lúcio Alcântara, the then-Governor of Ceará announced the construction of a passenger rail line in Cariri, which was later renamed Metrô do Cariri. The inauguration was scheduled for February 2007, but in January 2007 work on the line was halted due to the change in state government, and was only resumed in June 2007.

The Metro Cariri was officially opened for test service on 1 December 2009, and after further testing was opened for full commercial operation in 2010.

Operations

Line 
The gauge of this line is meter gauge. The frequency of trains on the line is every 40 minutes on weekdays, and every one hour and 20 minutes on Saturdays.

A second line for the system, to be called the South Line, is in the planning stages.

Rolling stock 

The fleet generally consists of a LRV trainset composition which is formed by two air-conditioned cars, and which are capable of carrying up to 330 passengers per train. The LRVs operated on this line are diesel hydraulic powered.

The trainsets are built by Bom Sinal Indústria e Comércio Ltda., a company established in the municipality of Barbalha. LRVs are stored in a depot in Crato.

During festival season, the number of cars is doubled due to demand.

See also 
 Teresina Metro

References

External links 
  

Transport in Ceará
Metre gauge railways in Brazil
Juazeiro do Norte